Zhu Binhou (4 December 1885 – 1940?), also known as Etienne Tsu, was an early Chinese aviator. Born in Shanghai, Zhu was a son of the prominent banker Zhu Zhiyao (朱志尧, a.k.a. Nicolas Tsu). He left for France to study mechanical engineering at the Université Lille 1, graduating in 1903. As he was fascinated with the design and operation of automobiles and ships, 1903 also brought about the revolutionary advent of the controlled, sustained, and powered heavier-than-air machines, which had driven Zhu Binhou into this new frontier of human flight.

Zhu Binhou gained his aviator's license, issued by the Aero Club de France, in 1914 at the beginning of World War I, and joined, as part of the French Foreign Legion, Escadrille SPA.37 of the French Air Service in 1915; he is credited with downing five German aircraft and observation balloons, and four probables between 10 July 1916 and 7 January 1917.

Demobilized in 1919, he returned to China where he took part in the creation of the Chinese Flying school which was equipped with French machines. A Colonel in 1925, he died in Shanghai in 1940.

See also
Feng Ru
Li Ruyan
Jianqiao air base
Civil and military/warlord aircraft in China pre-1937
Air battles of the War of Resistance/WWII 1937-45
Development of the Nationalist Air Force of China; the combined effort of overseas Chinese volunteer pilots and former warlord air force units joining the central authority of the Republic of China Air Force for the War of Resistance/World War II against the Imperial Japanese invasion from 1937 to 1945

References

Bibliography

External links
 

1885 births
1940 deaths
Date of death unknown
Year of death uncertain
People from Shanghai
Chinese aviators
French World War I flying aces
Officers of the French Foreign Legion
Aviation pioneers